Japanese football in 1954.

Emperor's Cup

National team

Results

Players statistics

Births
April 2 – Yuji Kishioku
April 5 – Yoshiichi Watanabe
May 13 – Hideki Maeda
September 13 – Shigeharu Ueki
October 29 – Hisao Sekiguchi

External links

 
Seasons in Japanese football